St. Bride's Radar Station was a United States Army General Surveillance Ground Radar Early Warning Station in the Dominion of Newfoundland. It was built during World War II and responsible for monitoring air traffic from Naval Station Argentia to RCAF Torbay and into the Atlantic Ocean. It was closed in 1945.

History
The site was established in 1942 as a United States Ground Radar Early Warning Station, funded by the United States Army, which stationed the 685th Air Warning Squadron on the site under operational control of Newfoundland Base Command at Pepperrell Air Force Base. Fifty-two members (three officers and 49 enlisted men) of the 685th were assigned to St Bride's. It operated an SCR-271 manned early-warning radar with information sent by radio to a plotting center at Pepperrell AFB to track aircraft. St Bride's was the third of a chain of four stations around the Newfoundland coast and was accordingly given the radio code name of "Trio". The station was assigned to Royal Canadian Air Force on 1 November 1944, and was given designation "No 41 RU". The RCAF operated the station until 7 October 1945.

United States Army Air Forces units and assignments 
Units:
 685th Air Warning Company, 1943
 Inactivated November 1944

Assignments:
 Newfoundland Base Command, Winter 1943

References

 Cornett, Lloyd H. and Johnson, Mildred W., A Handbook of Aerospace Defense Organization  1946 - 1980, Office of History, Aerospace Defense Center, Peterson AFB, CO (1980)

Radar stations of the United States Air Force
Installations of the United States Air Force in Canada
Military installations closed in 1945
Military installations in Newfoundland and Labrador
Military installations established in 1943
1943 establishments in Newfoundland and Labrador
1945 disestablishments in Newfoundland and Labrador